Javier Fernández (born 10 August 1981) is a Spanish judoka.

Achievements

References

External links
 
 

1981 births
Living people
Spanish male judoka
Mediterranean Games bronze medalists for Spain
Mediterranean Games medalists in judo
Competitors at the 2005 Mediterranean Games